Kim Waugh (née Waugh) is an Australian horse trainer, operating from Wyong Racecourse.

Her most notable achievement in Thoroughbred racing has been winning the 2005 Sydney Cup with the stayer Mahtoum.

She is married to former Australian cricketer, Mark Waugh.

References

External links
 Kim Waugh official web site

Year of birth missing (living people)
Living people
Australian horse trainers